Suni bin Mat Jerah (born 4 May 1968) is a retired Bruneian footballer. He played as a striker for the Brunei national team and most notably the Bruneian representative team that joined the Malaysian leagues in the late nineties, and was part of the 1999 Malaysia Cup-winning squad.

Club career
Suni first played with Brunei in the Liga Semi-Pro Malaysia in 1995, forming a lethal strike partnership with experienced striker Rosanan Samak. His M-League career came to a climax in 1999 when Brunei beat Sarawak FA 2–1 in the final of the Malaysia Cup, although he did not take the field. After Brunei were relegated from Premier 1 the next season, he chose to leave the team for Wijaya FC in the domestic league.

Now revered as a legend, Suni brought success to Wijaya with the Brunei FA Cup in 2002 and the B-League championship in 2003. In his last season as a Wijaya player, he scored a last-minute winner against Majra FC to put his team into the final of the 2008 Brunei FA Cup. He would be let down in his last game by a solitary MS ABDB goal in the final.

Suni came out of retirement to captain Perda FC for the 2012 Brunei National Football League (precursor to the Brunei Super League), but his side finished seventh in the 8-team group stage.

International career
Suni debuted at the 1995 SEA Games held in Thailand, scoring a goal against Singapore on 4 December. Brunei would lose all of their matches after this valiant 2–2 draw.

Suni played for Brunei at the 2000 AFC Asian Cup qualifying round, a disastrous campaign which included a heavy 9–0 defeat by Japan. His last outings for the national team were at the 2002 World Cup qualifying first round for AFC, playing the full ninety minutes in Brunei's record heaviest defeat, a 0–12 drubbing by the United Arab Emirates.

Honours

Brunei M-League Team
Malaysia Cup: 1999

Wijaya FC
Brunei FA Cup: 2002
B-League: 2003

References

External links

1968 births
Living people
Association football forwards
Bruneian footballers
Brunei international footballers
Wijaya FC players
Brunei (Malaysia Premier League team) players